Patriot Games is a 1987 novel by Tom Clancy. 

Patriot Game(s) may also refer to:

 "Patriot Games" (The Simpsons), a 2016 episode of The Simpsons
 "Patriot Games" (Family Guy), a 2006 episode of Family Guy
 "Patriot Games" (Modern Family), a 2015 episode of the television sitcom Modern Family
 Patriot Games (film), a 1992 film adaptation of Tom Clancy's book that stars Harrison Ford
 "The Patriot Game", an Irish ballad with a melody from the traditional tune "The Merry Month of May"
Traverse City Patriot Game, an annual high school football game in Traverse City, Michigan